Dickinson County is the name of three counties in the United States:

 Dickinson County, Iowa 
 Dickinson County, Kansas 
 Dickinson County, Michigan

See also
 Dickenson County, Virginia